Prof Arthur Geoffrey Walker FRS FRSE (17 July 1909 in Watford, Hertfordshire, England – 31 March 2001) was a British mathematician who made important contributions to physics and physical cosmology. Although he was an accomplished geometer, he is best remembered today for two important contributions to general relativity.

Together with H. P. Robertson, they devised the well-known Robertson-Walker metric for the Friedmann–Lemaître–Robertson–Walker cosmological models, which are exact solutions of the Einstein field equation. Together with Enrico Fermi, he introduced the notion of Fermi–Walker differentiation.

Early life
He was born in Watford on 17 July 1909 the son of Arthur John Walker (b.1879), a coach builder, and his wife, Eleanor Joanna Gosling.

Walker attended Watford Grammar School for Boys and won a scholarship to Balliol College, Oxford, where he graduated with first class honours in Mathematics. He then studied at Merton College, Oxford. He then went as a postgraduate to University of Edinburgh, studying under Prof Arthur Eddington and gaining his first doctorate (PhD).

Academic career
Walker took up a post as Lecturer at Imperial College in 1935; the following year he was appointed as Lecturer in Pure Mathematics at the University of Liverpool, a post he held until 1947, when he moved to the University of Sheffield as Professor of Pure Mathematics. 

In 1946 he was elected a Fellow of the Royal Society of Edinburgh. His proposers were Harold Stanley Ruse, Sir Edmund Taylor Whittaker, David Gibb and William Edge. He won the Society's Keith Medal for the period 1947/49.

In 1952 he returned to Liverpool University, in 1962 becoming Dean of its Faculty of Science. Having been elected a Fellow of the Royal Society in 1955, he served as a member of the organisation's council from 1961 to 1962. He served as president of the London Mathematical Society from 1962 to 1963. Walker retired from Liverpool University in 1974.

Publications

Harmonic Spaces (1962)
An Introduction to Geometrical Cosmology (1975)

Awards and honours
Fellow of the Royal Astronomical Society, 1934
Fellow of the Royal Society of Edinburgh, 1946
Berwick Prize, 1947
Keith Medal, 1947-9
Fellow of the Royal Society, 1955

Personal life
Walker married Phyllis Ashcroft Freeman in 1939; the couple were accomplished ballroom dancers. He died in Chichester on 31 March 2001, aged 91.

References

External links

1909 births
2001 deaths
People from Watford
British cosmologists
British relativity theorists
20th-century British mathematicians
Alumni of Balliol College, Oxford
Alumni of Merton College, Oxford
Alumni of the University of Edinburgh
People educated at Watford Grammar School for Boys
Fellows of the Royal Society